Duck soup may refer to:

 Duck Soup (1933 film), starring the Marx Brothers
 Duck Soup (1927 film), featuring Laurel and Hardy
 Oritang, Korean duck soup
 "Duck Soup", an episode of Even Stevens
 "Duck Soup", a song by Baba Brooks
 Noble, a production studio whose previous names include "Duck Soup Producktions" and "Duck Soup Studios"

See also
 Czernina, Polish duck blood soup
 Duck soup noodles, Malaysian
 Duck Soup to Nuts, a 1944 Warner Bros. animated short
 "Duct Soup", a 1997 episode of the television series Red Dwarf